Montroydite is the mineral form of mercury(II) oxide with formula HgO. It is a rare mercury mineral. It was first described for an occurrence in the mercury deposit at Terlingua, Texas and named for Montroyd Sharp who was an owner of the deposit.

Montroydite occurs in mercury deposits of hydrothermal origin. Associated minerals include: native mercury, cinnabar, metacinnabar, calomel, eglestonite, terlinguaite, mosesite, kleinite, edgarbaileyite, gypsum, calcite and dolomite.

References

Mercury(II) minerals
Oxide minerals
Orthorhombic minerals